Ascanio Cortés (5 July 1914 – 7 February 1998) was a Chilean footballer. He played in 13 matches for the Chile national football team from 1935 to 1941. He was also part of Chile's squad for the 1935 South American Championship.

References

External links
 

1914 births
1998 deaths
Chilean footballers
Chile international footballers
Place of birth missing
Association football defenders
Audax Italiano footballers